Greece is a country in southeastern Europe. Greece is developed country with an advanced high-income economy, a high quality of life, and a very high standard of living. A founding member of the United Nations, Greece was the tenth member to join the European Communities (precursor to the European Union) and has been part of the Eurozone since 2001. It is also a member of numerous other international institutions, including the Council of Europe, the North Atlantic Treaty Organization (NATO), the Organisation for Economic Co-operation and Development (OECD), the World Trade Organization (WTO), the Organization for Security and Co-operation in Europe (OSCE), and the Organisation internationale de la Francophonie (OIF). Greece's unique cultural heritage, large tourism industry, prominent shipping sector and geostrategic importance classify it as a middle power. It is the largest economy in the Balkans, where it is an important regional investor. 

S.A. (Greek: A.E) is used as a suffix to denote a public limited company, as in Plc. For further information on the types of business entities in this country and their abbreviations, see "Business entities in Greece".

Largest Firms 
This list shows firms in the Forbes Global 2000, which ranks firms by total revenues reported before 31 March 2018.

Notable firms 
This list includes notable companies with primary headquarters located in the country. The industry and sector follow the Industry Classification Benchmark taxonomy. Organizations which have ceased operations are included and noted as defunct.

See also 
 List of companies listed on the Athens Stock Exchange
 List of electric power companies in Greece

References

External links 
 Greek business directory
 Top 500 companies in Greece

Greece